Julie Law (born c. ) is an American molecular and cellular biologist.  Law's pioneering work on DNA methylation patterns led to the discovery of the role of the CLASSY protein family in DNA methylation. Law is currently an associate professor at the Salk Institute for Biological Studies.

Early life and education 
Law began her scientific career at the Oregon State University where she completed a B.S. in biochemistry and biophysics. She completed her undergraduate research in the laboratory of Dr. Walt Ream. studying plant-microbe interactions She moved to the east coast to complete her doctoral work in biochemistry at Johns Hopkins School of Medicine under the mentorship of Dr. Barbara Sollner-Webb Law's Ph.D. work uncovered the unique RNA editing mechanisms used by pathogenic eukaryotes called trypanosomes. Following her doctoral work, Law moved back to the west coast to pursue postdoctoral training at the University of California, Los Angeles in the lab of Dr. Steven Jacobsen, where she studied DNA methylation in Arabidopsis, a common model organism in biology allowing her to study epigenetic regulation.

Career and research 
Law's postdoctoral work, studying DNA methylation at UC Los Angeles, was followed by her recruitment for a faculty position at the Salk Institute for Biological Studies in 2012. Currently, Law's lab at the Salk Institute studies epigenetic modifications in Arabidopsis thaliana to probe how epigenetic tags are recognized by proteins to regulate gene expression. Law is currently working with several other Salk scientists as a part of the Harnessing Plants Initiative to engineer plants to store more carbon dioxide as a means to harness more carbon dioxide from the atmosphere to combat climate change.

Publications 
Selected publications:
 Wu, S., Turner, K.M., Nguyen, N., Raviram, R., Erb, M., Santini, J., Luebeck, J., Rajkumar, U., Diao, Y., Li, B., Zhang, W., Jameson, N., Corces, M.R., Granja, J.M., Chen, X., Coruh, C., Abnousi, A., Houston, J., Ye, Z., Hu, R., Yu, M., Kim, H., Law, J.A., Verhaak, R.G.W., Hu, M., Furnari, F.B., Chang, H.Y., Ren, B., Bafna, V., Mischel, P.S. Circular ecDNA promotes accessible chromatin and high oncogene expression. (2019) Nature. 575(7784):699-703. DOI: 10.1038/s41586-019-1763-5
 Argueso, C.T., Assmann, S.M., Birnbaum, K.D., Chen, S., Dinneny, J.R., Doherty, C.J., Eveland, A.L., Friesner, J., Greenlee, V.R., Law, J.A., Marshall-Colón, A., Mason, G.A., O'Lexy, R., Peck, S.C., Schmitz, R.J., Song, L., Stern, D., Varagona, M.J., Walley, J.W., Williams, C.M. Directions for research and training in plant omics: Big Questions and Big Data. (2019) Plant Direct. 3(4):e00133. DOI: 10.1002/pld3.133
(2018) Proceedings of the National Academy of Sciences of the United States of America. DOI: 10.1073/pnas.1810582115
 Zhou, M., Palanca, A.M.S., Law, J.A. Locus-specific control of the de novo DNA methylation pathway in Arabidopsis by the CLASSY family. (2018) Nature Genetics. 50(6). DOI: 10.1038/s41588-018-0115-y
 Li, D., Palanca, A.M.S., Won, S.Y., Gao, L., Feng, Y., Vashisht, A.A., Liu, L., Zhao, Y., Liu, X., Wu, X., Li, S., Le, B., Kim, Y.J., Yang, G., Li, S., Liu, J., Wohlschlegel, J.A., Guo, H., Mo, B., Chen, X., Law, J.A. The MBD7 complex promotes expression of methylated transgenes without significantly altering their methylation status. (2017) Elife. 6. DOI: 10.7554/eLife.19893
 Zhou, M., Law, J.A. RNA Pol IV and V in gene silencing: Rebel polymerases evolving away from Pol II's rules. (2015) Current Opinion in Plant Biology. 27:154-64. DOI: 10.1016/j.pbi.2015.07.005
 Law, J.A., Du, J., Hale, C.J., Feng, S., Krajewski, K., Palanca, A.M., Strahl, B.D., Patel, D.J., Jacobsen, S.E. Polymerase IV occupancy at RNA-directed DNA methylation sites requires SHH1. (2013) Nature. 498(7454):385-9. DOI: 10.1038/nature12178
 Zhong, X., Hale, C.J., Law, J.A., Johnson, L.M., Feng, S., Tu, A., Jacobsen, S.E. DDR complex facilitates global association of RNA polymerase V to promoters and evolutionarily young transposons. (2012) Nature Structural & Molecular Biology. 19(9):870-5. DOI: 10.1038/nsmb.2354
 Law, J.A., Vashisht, A.A., Wohlschlegel, J.A., Jacobsen, S.E. SHH1, a homeodomain protein required for DNA methylation, as well as RDR2, RDM4, and chromatin remodeling factors, associate with RNA polymerase IV. (2011) PLOS Genetics. 7(7):e1002195. DOI: 10.1371/journal.pgen.1002195
 Greenberg, M.V., Ausin, I., Chan, S.W., Cokus, S.J., Cuperus, J.T., Feng, S., Law, J.A., Chu, C., Pellegrini, M., Carrington, J.C., Jacobsen, S.E. Identification of genes required for de novo DNA methylation in Arabidopsis. (2011) Epigenetics. 6(3):344-54.
 Rajakumara, E., Law, J.A., Simanshu, D.K., Voigt, P., Johnson, L.M., Reinberg, D., Patel, D.J., Jacobsen, S.E. A dual flip-out mechanism for 5mC recognition by the Arabidopsis SUVH5 SRA domain and its impact on DNA methylation and H3K9 dimethylation in vivo. (2011) Genes & Development. 25(2):137-52. DOI: 10.1101/gad.1980311
 Guo, L., Yu, Y., Law, J.A., Zhang, X. SET DOMAIN GROUP2 is the major histone H3 lysine [corrected] 4 trimethyltransferase in Arabidopsis. (2010) Proceedings of the National Academy of Sciences of the United States of America. 107(43):18557-62. DOI: 10.1073/pnas.1010478107
 Law, J.A., Ausin, I., Johnson, L.M., Vashisht, A.A., Zhu, J.K., Wohlschlegel, J.A., Jacobsen, S.E. A protein complex required for polymerase V transcripts and RNA- directed DNA methylation in Arabidopsis. (2010) Current Biology. 20(10):951-6. DOI: 10.1016/j.cub.2010.03.062
 Law, J.A., Jacobsen, S.E. Establishing, maintaining and modifying DNA methylation patterns in plants and animals. (2010) Nature Reviews. Genetics. 11(3):204-20. DOI: 10.1038/nrg2719
 Law, J.A., Jacobsen, S.E. Molecular biology. Dynamic DNA methylation. (2009) Science. 323(5921):1568-9. DOI: 10.1126/science.1172782
 Johnson, L.M., Law, J.A., Khattar, A., Henderson, I.R., Jacobsen, S.E. SRA-domain proteins required for DRM2-mediated de novo DNA methylation. (2008) PLOS Genetics. 4(11):e1000280. DOI: 10.1371/journal.pgen.1000280

Awards
Law has received the following awards:

 2015 Rita Allen Scholar Award
 2007 Ruth L. Kirschstein National Research Service Award, National Institutes of Health
 2000 Howard Hughes Medical Institute Summer Fellowship, Oregon State University

References

External links
JA Law at Google scholar

Oregon State University alumni
University of California, Los Angeles alumni
American molecular biologists
Johns Hopkins School of Medicine alumni
Living people
Year of birth missing (living people)
Salk Institute for Biological Studies people